Sawaeng Ha is the northernmost district (amphoe) of Ang Thong province, central Thailand.

Sawaeng Ha in Thai language means 'seek' or 'find'.

History
The name of Tambon Sawaeng Ha was first found in the Ayutthaya kingdom records.

In 1945 Tambon Si Bua Thong area was still a rural area covered by deep forest between the two provinces Suphanburi and Sing Buri. This made it a popular hiding place for criminals. The government thus set up a commando division in Tambon Sawaeng Ha to sweep them up. 

Effective January 1 1948 the government upgraded the area to a minor district (king amphoe) by splitting five sub-districts from Pho Thong District. In 1956 it was upgraded to a full district.

Geography
Neighbouring districts are (from the north clockwise) Khai Bang Rachan and Tha Chang of Sing Buri province, Pho Thong of Ang Thong province, and Si Prachan, Sam Chuk and Doem Bang Nang Buat of Suphanburi province.

Administration
The district is divided into seven sub-districts (tambons), which are further subdivided into 61 villages (mubans). Sawaeng Ha is also a sub-district municipality (thesaban tambon) which covers parts of the tambon Sawaeng Ha. There are a further seven tambon administrative organizations (TAO).

References

External links
amphoe.com (Thai)

Sawaeng Ha